Talking Man is a 1986 fantasy novel by American author Terry Bisson. The book tells the story of a Kentucky mechanic called "Talking Man".  Talking Man is a wizard who creates his own world.

Reception
Orson Scott Card rated Talking Man as one of the best SF books of 1986, saying "Bisson brings off his story of a Kentucky junkyard wizard with panache."

Dave Langford reviewed Talking Man for White Dwarf #95, and stated that "quest to save the world from having never been involves a demented car-chase from Kentucky to the North Pole: enjoyably offbeat."

References

External links 
 Terry Bisson: the author's own website
 Review by Jo Walton
 Extract from Publishers Weekly review

1986 American novels
1986 fantasy novels
American fantasy novels
Novels set in Kentucky
Works by Terry Bisson